The Veterans Memorial Medical Center (formerly known as Veterans Memorial Hospital) was established in 1955 with full US Government assistance under the US Veterans Administration to provide quality hospitalization, medical care and treatment to Filipino veterans as provided by U.S. public law. The patients were originally those who suffer from service-connected disabilities arising from their services with the USAFFE, recognized guerrilla units, Philippine Scouts, and Philippine Commonwealth Army, which was later extended to AFP retirees and their dependents.

History
The Veterans Memorial Medical Center was established pursuant to Public Law 865, 80th U.S. Congress on July 8, 1948, which provided $9.4 million for the construction of a hospital facility with the land to be donated by the Philippine government. The law was implemented in the country by an agreement between the U.S. and the Philippines signed by then Pres. Elpidio Quirino and the U.S. Ambassador to the Philippines Myron Cowen. Various amendments have been introduced and the latest is Republic Act 6948 which has liberalized the definition of veterans which now included the Armed Forces of the Philippines (AFP) retirees. Likewise, the hospitalization benefit was extended to the veteran dependents. It is one of three units under the Philippine Veterans Affairs Office (PVAO). PVAO is a bureau under the Department of National Defense. The other two units under PVAO are the PVAO Proper, and Military Shrines Service.

The  land was originally intended to be location of Executive Mansion or the new Malacañan Palace on the original masterplan of Quezon City in 1939. It is now being eyed to be privatized as part of the Quezon City Central Business District Redevelopment Plan or Triangle Park.

Service Coverage
Filipino veterans covered under this program embrace:  
  The Philippine Revolutionary Forces that took up arms against the Spaniards and the Americans during the past Philippine revolutions and wars,  
  members of the First Philippine National Guards, either before or after its integration into the Army of the United States of America,
  Filipino citizens who are enlisted and or commissioned and served during World War I under the Allied Armed Forces,
  Philippine Scouts who were in the service prior to October 6, 1945, with wartime service,
  USAFFE with wartime service in the Philippines,
  Recognized World War II guerrilla units in the Philippines and
  AFP units that participated in the Korean War.
All that a patient needs to present in seeking admission is a certificate of his military service from the Philippine Veterans Board and this plus his marriage certificate and birth certificate of minor child if the dependent is in need of hospital care. Emergency cases, however, may be brought to the hospital directly after which pertinent papers may be secured later on.

Prominent personalities admitted
 Former President Emilio Aguinaldo (died 1964)
 Former President Sergio Osmeña (died 1961)
 Former President Elpidio Quirino (admitted 1956)
 Former Iglesia ni Cristo Executive Minister Felix Manalo (died 1963)
 Former Senator Benigno Aquino Jr. (admitted 1980)
 Former President Joseph Estrada (admitted 2001)
 Former President Gloria Macapagal Arroyo (admitted 2011), was under hospital arrest until her release on July 21, 2016.

References

Sources
 Department of National Defense Publication, 1962 Edition

External links
 Veterans Memorial Medical Center and the PVAO 

Hospital buildings completed in 1955
Hospitals established in 1955
Hospitals in Quezon City
Military hospitals in the Philippines
Buildings and structures in Quezon City
Department of National Defense (Philippines)
1955 establishments in the Philippines